The present Immanuel Episcopal Church was finished in Bellows Falls in Vermont in 1869 and was designed by the renowned Gothic revival architect Richard M. Upjohn. The building's Gothic style would have been typical of 14th-century France. The multi-colored fish scale slate roof is typical of the Victorian Gothic style of architecture.

One of the building's notable features is the buttressed and pinnacled bell tower that has an octagonal "lantern"-styled top. There is a Paul Revere bell hanging in the tower that hung in the original 1817 church that was on the same site.

One famous interment in the cemetery next door is Hetty Green, the "Witch of Wall Street", who was the wealthiest woman in the world during her time. Other notables burials include American Civil War generals Edwin H. Stoughton and his younger brother Charles B. Stoughton.

References

External links
Official website

Buildings and structures in Bellows Falls, Vermont
Churches completed in 1869
Episcopal churches in Vermont
Gothic Revival architecture in Vermont
Richard Michell Upjohn church buildings
Churches in Windham County, Vermont